Nesampelos is a genus of flowering plants in the daisy family, native to the Island of Hispaniola in the West Indies.

 Species
 Nesampelos alainii (J.Jiménez Alm.) B.Nord. - Dominican Republic
 Nesampelos hotteana (Urb. & Ekman) B.Nord. - Haiti
 Nesampelos lucens (Poir.) B.Nord. - Haiti

References

Senecioneae
Flora of Haiti
Flora of the Dominican Republic
Asteraceae genera